Caldwell County Courthouse is a historic courthouse located in Kingston, Caldwell County, Missouri. It was built between 1896 and 1898 and is a two-story red-brick building, set upon a regular ashlar foundation. The building measures 74 feet by 69 feet.  It has a truncated slate hip-roof, with a square-plan cupola and a bell-dome roof.

It was listed on the National Register of Historic Places in 1972.

References

County courthouses in Missouri
Courthouses on the National Register of Historic Places in Missouri
Government buildings completed in 1898
Buildings and structures in Caldwell County, Missouri
National Register of Historic Places in Caldwell County, Missouri